Ana and the Wolves is a 1973 Spanish drama film  directed by  Carlos Saura.  Starring Geraldine Chaplin as a foreign governess who comes to an isolated house to take care of the children of a convoluted family. The film is encoded with political symbolism of Francoist Spain. Saura’s 1979 Mamá cumple cien años was a sequel of sorts. It was entered into the 1973 Cannes Film Festival.

Plot 
Ana, a young foreign governess, arrives to an isolated country estate in arid region of Castile, near Madrid. She has come to take charge of three little girls whose mother, Luchy, greets Ana upon arrival. While Ana is unpacking, José, an uncle of the girls, introduces himself as the voice of order and authority in the family. In case Ana runs into any problem she must go to him, he explains.

A family dinner that evening allows Ana to meet her eccentric employers. The family consists of three middle age brothers (José, Juan and Fernando), their ailing mother, Mama; Luchy, Juan’s wife, and the couple’s three daughters: Carlota, Victoria and Natalia. At night, Natalia wakes up screaming after a nightmare. Juan, the father of the three girls, lusting over Ana, takes advantage of the situation to enter her bedroom. Firmly but politely, she rejects his sexual advances. Dominated by an uncontrollable sex drive, the rejected Juan looks for consolation with Amparo, one of the maids.

Surprisingly, Ana starts receiving erotic letters signed by a secret admirer who desires to be with her. They are delivered with rare postage from distance places each of them increasingly closer. José explains to Ana that he has not only opened and read those letters, but that he knows who has been sending them. Juan, he tells her, has been writing those letters using the family valuable collection of stamps to deceive her. José has set up a small museum of military dress in his study and he offers Ana his protection and some economical compensation if she takes care of the uniforms.

Fernando, the most subdued of the three brothers, has moved out of the main house to establish his residence in a nearby cave where he practices mystical incantations in an effort to levitate. Fernando intrigues Ana the most. She is both appalled by him and attracted to his way of life, as if understanding why he wants to escape from the world.

Between bouts of epilepsy and gout, Mama remains the protectress of the family unit. When she and Ana engage in direct dialogue, the old dowager gives Ana a bit of the background of the three sons as she shows the governess their childhood clothing she has saved for years. “ You must be understanding with them” mama tells her, as Ana becomes interested in the absurdity of what has been happening.

Ana now actively leads the three brothers on, playing to the fantasy life of each of the three men, at times, outwardly mocking them. Recruited to help José with his museum when he shots a flying bird to scare her, Ana is bemused and gives him a medal as a reward.

Juan is so obsessed with Ana that at one point he sneaks into her bedroom to brush his teeth with her toothbrush. She is bemused by his antics. To embarrass him she makes him open and read out loud one of the letters. Later on she kisses him and asks him if he is willing to leave his wife for her. When he  says yes, she scares him with calling his wife.

Only with Fernando does Ana develop a more intimate, although still platonic relationship. The entire family goes to see Fernando at his cave. They are worried because he has refused to eat. Jose’s forces some food into his mouth, that later Ana retrieves, realizing that he has not swallowed it. The three girls looking for a missing doll find it finally buried in mud and with the hair cut off. The girls blamed the wolves. Ana reports the incident to Juan who explains that Fernando, who has fetish for hair, is the culprit.

The presence of Ana becomes disturbing in that house to the extent that Luchy, Juan’s wife, wants to kill herself. When it becomes apparent that Ana has been leading her sons on sowing doubts in their thinking and endangering the unity of the family, mama orders that she be dismissed. The three brothers waylay her on the road as she leaves the state. The three assault Anna. Forcing her to the ground, Fernando cuts off her hair; Juan rapes her; and José takes a pistol to her head and shoots her. The final freeze-frame is of Ana’s agonized face in gruesome close up.

Cast
 Geraldine Chaplin as Ana
 Fernando Fernán Gómez as Fernando
 José María Prada as José
 José Vivó as Juan
 Rafaela Aparicio as The mother
 Charo Soriano as Luchy
 Marisa Porcel as Amparo
 Nuria Lage as Natalia
 María José Puerta as Carlota
 Sara Gil as Victoria

Analysis
Ana and the Wolves is a political allegory of Spain under Francisco Franco. The crumbling mansion is Spain, governed by an old crippled woman and inhabited by her sons who represent the strings that move the country with liberty cut off. José is the authoritarianism and represent the military; Fernando, the religious hypocrisy represents the church and Juan, embodying sexuality, represents the family. The three brothers, like wolves, stalk their prey and will not stop until they achieve their purpose. Ana, the foreigner in that closeted world, comes to disturb the internal order and for that pays the ultimate price.

DVD release
 Ana and the Wolves  is available in Region 2 DVD.

References

External links 
 

1973 films
1970s Spanish-language films
1973 drama films
Spain in fiction
Films directed by Carlos Saura
Films shot in Madrid
Films with screenplays by Rafael Azcona
Spanish drama films
1970s Spanish films